Keyneton is a locality in South Australia. At the 2011 census, Keyneton and the surrounding area had a population of 534.

The town was named after English pastoralist Joseph Keynes (related to the Keynes Family), who had settled the area in 1842 and whose descendants still live and farm in the area. It is in the Eden Valley wine region.

The historic former North Rhine Mine Engine House in Pine Hut Road and the Bridge Over the River Somme on the Sedan-Angaston Road are listed on the South Australian Heritage Register.

Notable people
 Sarah Lindsay Evans (1816–1898), temperance activist

References

Towns in South Australia